Kensington is a village in Nassau County, on the North Shore of Long Island, in New York, United States. The population was 1,161 at the 2010 census.

The Incorporated Village of Kensington is in the Town of North Hempstead and is on the Great Neck Peninsula.

History
On November 7, 1921, by a unanimous vote of the residents, Kensington incorporated as a village. The first village elections for officers and trustees were held on November 28, 1921, and Byron Eldred was elected unanimously as its first Mayor. The village was named after London’s Kensington Gardens, and the entrance gates at the main entrance to the village were based on Kensington Garden's gates.

Many of Kensington's mayors have served for substantially long terms. Notable are Mayor Seymour Cohen, Mayor Steven Randall and Mayor Bonnie Golub. The mayor also serves as Commissioner of Police. The Village of Kensington was initially established as an enclave of homes of famous celebrities.

The waterfront park was deeded to the Kensington Association in August 1915. This included a 500-foot sand beach on Manhasset Bay, miniature lakes, a boat dock, tennis courts, and one of the largest fresh water swimming pools in the United States. 

In order to maintain the residential character of the community, a restrictive covenant was written to keep business and industry out. Furthermore, a membership corporation called the Kensington Association was initiated to take care of maintenance and police protection.

Kensington was recognized as one of the safest places to live in the U.S. and remains that way to this day.

In 2017, Niche.com ranked Kensington #1 in its lists of both the "Best Places to Live in New York" and the "Best Suburbs to Live in New York".

Geography

According to the United States Census Bureau, the village has a total area of 0.2 square mile (0.6 km2), all  land.

Demographics

As of the census of 2000, there were 1,209 people, 424 households, and 339 families residing in the village. The population density was 4,752.1 people per square mile (1,867.2/km2). There were 447 housing units at an average density of 1,757.0 per square mile (690.4/km2). The racial & ethnic makeup of the village was 91.89% White, 0.66% African American, 4.96% Asian, 1.32% from other ethnicities and/or ethnic groups, and 1.16% from two or more races. Hispanic or Latino of any race were 3.97% of the population.

There were 424 households, out of which 38.0% had children under the age of 18 living with them, 74.5% were married couples living together, 4.2% had a female householder with no husband present, and 20.0% were non-families. 18.9% of all households were made up of individuals, and 16.5% had someone living alone who was 65 years of age or older. The average household size was 2.85 and the average family size was 3.27.

In the village, the population was spread out, with 27.2% under the age of 18, 4.9% from 18 to 24, 18.4% from 25 to 44, 28.4% from 45 to 64, and 21.1% who were 65 years of age or older. The median age was 45 years. For every 100 females, there were 90.7 males. For every 100 females age 18 and over, there were 84.9 males.

The median income for a household in the village was $115,916, and the median income for a family was $133,235. Males had a median income of $100,000 versus $62,500 for females. The per capita income for the village was $59,183. About 0.9% of families and 1.2% of the population were below the poverty line, including 1.5% of those under age 18 and none of those age 65 or over.

As per the United States 2000 Census, Kensington had the highest percentage of Israeli American residents among all communities in the United States, at 6.2%.

Government

Village government 
As of September 2021, the Mayor of Kensington is Susan Lopatkin, the Deputy Mayor is Jeffrey Greener, and the Village Trustees are Phil Bornstein, Brent Greenspan, and Alina Hendler.

Representation in higher government

Town representation 
Kensington is located in the Town of North Hempstead's 4th Council district, which as of September 2021 is represented on the North Hempstead Town Council by Veronica Lurvey (D–Kensington).

Nassau County representation 
Kensington is located in Nassau County's 10th Legislative district, which as of January 2023 is represented in the Nassau County Legislature by Mazi Melesa Pilip (R–Great Neck).

New York State representation

New York State Assembly 
Kensington is located in the New York State Assembly's 16th Assembly district, which as of July 2021 is represented by Gina Sillitti (D–Manorhaven).

New York State Senate 
Kensington is located in the New York State Senate's 7th State Senate district, which as of July 2021 is represented in the New York State Senate by Anna Kaplan (D–North Hills).

Federal representation

United States Congress 
Kensington is located in New York's 3rd congressional district, which as of July 2021 is represented in the United States Congress by Tom Suozzi (D–Glen Cove).

United States Senate 
Like the rest of New York, Kensington is represented in the United States Senate by Charles Schumer (D) and Kirsten Gillibrand (D).

Politics 
In the 2016 U.S. presidential election, the majority of Kensington voters voted for Hillary Clinton (D).

Education

School districts 
The majority of Kensington is located within the boundaries of (and is thus served by) the Great Neck Union Free School District, although the easternmost section of the village is located within the Manhasset Union Free School District (though all homes are in the Great Neck part of Kensington). As such, all children who reside within Kensington and attend public schools go to Great Neck's schools.

Library districts 
The majority of Kensington is located within the boundaries of (and is thus served by) the Great Neck Library District, although the easternmost section of the village is located within the Manhasset Library District (though all homes are in the Great Neck part of Kensington). The boundaries of both library districts within the village roughly correspond with those of the two school districts

Notable people 

 Anna M. Kaplan – New York State Senator for New York's 7th State Senate district; former Town of North Hempstead Councilwoman.
 Irwin J. Landes – Former New York State Assemblyman.
 Lester L. Wolff – Former United States Congressman for NY-3 and NY-6.

References

External links 

 Official website

Israeli-American culture in New York (state)
Israeli-American history
Great Neck Peninsula
Villages in New York (state)
Villages in Nassau County, New York
Populated coastal places in New York (state)